Guy Hadani (born 24 May 1988) is a former Israeli footballer who played for Maccabi Tel Aviv and Hapoel Marmorek

Career
Hadani was brought up through the ranks of Maccabi Tel Aviv and joined the senior team as a third goalkeeper in 2006, while still playing as starting goalkeeper for the club's youth team. In 2007–08 and 2008–09 Hadani was loaned to Hapoel Marmorek, but played only a handful of matches, as he was conscripted to the Israel Defense Forces.

Hadani returned to Maccabi Tel Aviv's squad for the 2009–10 season, but didn't play any match. He quit football at the end of the season.

Hadani represented Israel with the national U-19 team and U-17 team and was part of the U-17 team in the 2005 UEFA European Under-17 Championship, playing in two of the team's matches in the championship.

References

External links
 

1988 births
Living people
Israeli footballers
Maccabi Tel Aviv F.C. players
Hapoel Marmorek F.C. players
Israeli Premier League players
Footballers from Tel Aviv
Association football goalkeepers